In topology, a branch of mathematics, the smash product of two pointed spaces (i.e. topological spaces with distinguished basepoints) (X, x0) and (Y, y0) is the quotient of the product space X × Y under the identifications (x, y0) ∼ (x0, y) for all x in X and y in Y.  The smash product is itself a pointed space, with basepoint being the equivalence class of  (x0, y0). The smash product is usually denoted X ∧ Y or X ⨳ Y. The smash product depends on the choice of basepoints (unless both X and Y are homogeneous).

One can think of X and Y as sitting inside X × Y as the subspaces X × {y0} and {x0} × Y. These subspaces intersect at a single point: (x0, y0), the basepoint of X × Y. So the union of these subspaces can be identified with the wedge sum X ∨ Y. The smash product is then the quotient

The smash product shows up in homotopy theory, a branch of algebraic topology. In homotopy theory, one often works with a different category of spaces than the category of all topological spaces. In some of these categories the definition of the smash product must be modified slightly. For example, the smash product of two CW complexes is a CW complex if one uses the product of CW complexes in the definition rather than the product topology. Similar modifications are necessary in other categories.

Examples

 The smash product of any pointed space X with a 0-sphere (a discrete space with two points) is homeomorphic to X.
 The smash product of two circles is a quotient of the torus homeomorphic to the 2-sphere.
 More generally, the smash product of two spheres Sm and Sn is homeomorphic to the sphere Sm+n.
 The smash product of a space X with a circle is homeomorphic to the reduced suspension of X: 
 The k-fold iterated reduced suspension of X is homeomorphic to the smash product of X and a k-sphere 
 In domain theory, taking the product of two domains (so that the product is strict on its arguments).

As a symmetric monoidal product
For any pointed spaces X, Y, and Z in an appropriate "convenient" category (e.g., that of compactly generated spaces), there are natural (basepoint preserving) homeomorphisms

However, for the naive category of pointed spaces, this fails, as shown by the counterexample  and  found by Dieter Puppe. A proof due to Kathleen Lewis that Puppe's counterexample is indeed a counterexample can be found in the book of Johann Sigurdsson and J. Peter May.

These isomorphisms make the appropriate category of pointed spaces into a symmetric monoidal category with the smash product as the monoidal product and the pointed 0-sphere (a two-point discrete space) as the unit object. One can therefore think of the smash product as a kind of tensor product in an appropriate category of pointed spaces.

Adjoint relationship
Adjoint functors make the analogy between the tensor product and the smash product more precise. In the category of R-modules over a commutative ring R, the tensor functor  is left adjoint to the internal Hom functor , so that

In the category of pointed spaces, the smash product plays the role of the tensor product in this formula: if  are compact Hausdorff then we have an adjunction

where  denotes continuous maps that send basepoint to basepoint, and   carries the compact-open topology.

In particular, taking  to be the unit circle , we see that the reduced suspension functor  is left adjoint to the loop space functor :

Notes

References

Topology
Homotopy theory
Operations on structures